"Hallelujah Money" is a song by British alternative rock virtual band Gorillaz, featuring Benjamin Clementine. The song was released on 19 January 2017. The song marks the group's musical comeback, and their first musical release since 2012's "DoYaThing". "Hallelujah Money" is a political song with gospel-style vocals on top of avant garde/electronic music. The song features English artist and musician Benjamin Clementine, marking Clementine's first collaboration with Gorillaz.

Music video
The music video was uploaded to the UPROXX official YouTube channel on 19 January 2017. The video has Clementine singing in a gold-played elevator, and features a cameo from Gorillaz lead singer 2D, who appears in puppet form at various points through the song. Various video clips, including from Animal Farm, Fantastic Planet, Village of the Damned, a spaghetti western starring Clint Eastwood, CCTV footage of an evil clown, documentary footage of tribal dancers, and a procession wearing white capirotes, are projected behind Clementine. The video ends abruptly with a clip from the episode "Karate Choppers" of the TV series SpongeBob SquarePants, although this is not present on the album version.

Personnel
Damon Albarn – vocals, synthesizer, programming
Benjamin Clementine – vocals
The Twilite Tone – drums
John Davis – mastering engineer, engineering
Stephen Sedgwick – engineering, mixing engineer
Samuel Egglenton – assistant
KT Pipal – assistant
The Humanz (Rasul A-Salaam, Starr Busby, Melanie J-B Charles, Drea D'Nur, Giovanni James, Marcus Anthony Johnson, Janelle Kroll, Brandon Markell Holmes, Imani Vonshà) – additional vocals

References

2017 songs
Gorillaz songs
Songs written by Damon Albarn
Gospel songs
Electronica songs